Clube Desportivo Lousanense is a Portuguese sports club from Lousã.

The men's football team last played in the I AF Coimbra, which they won in 2019–20. The team played on the Portuguese second tier until the 1989–90 Segunda Divisão, subsequently finding themselves in the new third tier Segunda Divisão B until being relegated in 1994. Another relegation followed from the 1996–97 Terceira Divisão. Two more Terceira Divisão spells followed from 2000 to 2001 and 2007 to 2009.

References

Football clubs in Portugal
Association football clubs established in 1946
1946 establishments in Portugal